Paston College (previously Paston Sixth Form College) is a sixth form college located in the town of North Walsham, Norfolk. The college has been part of City College Norwich, following a merger of the two colleges, since 1 December 2017.

History
Sir William Paston's Free School (known as Paston School) was founded on the present site in 1606 by local magistrate and landowner Sir William Paston. An all-boys boarding grammar school, it sent most of its pupils to Gonville College, Cambridge. In 1610, Sir William died and the Trustees created by his will continued to keep the school in operation. The Trustees continue to own two of the college's three sites. In 1766, a new school building on the Grammar School Road was completed. From 1700 until 1984, Paston School had four houses, Tenison (Red), Wharton (Blue), Hoste (White) and Nelson (Yellow). In 1919, North Walsham High School for Girls, a girls grammar school was opened by the Misses Cooke, known locally as "Cookies" to complement the work of Paston. The expansion of local railways led more pupils travelling daily to Paston by railway (known as "train boys"), and by 1946 more than 270 boys were day pupils. Students continued to board until the mid-1950s. The Twentieth Century brought radical changes to education in Britain, with the 1902 and 1944 Education Acts. In 1908, Paston School became a public secondary school under the new Norfolk Local Education Authority. By 1944, the Butler Education Act abolished school fees. In 1953, Paston School became a voluntary aided grammar school and later a voluntary controlled grammar school. Paston Sixth Form College was formed in 1984 when grammar schools, Paston School and North Walsham High School for Girls merged. In 1993, the college was incorporated as an Independent College of Further Education under the 1991 Further and Higher Education Act. In 2017, Paston Sixth Form College merged with City College Norwich and changed its name to Paston College. The college occupies the buildings of its 2 predecessor schools. The two sites include buildings dating from the 18th, 19th and 20th centuries, set in extensive lawns in the centre of the town.

Curriculum
Paston College offers A-Levels, GCSEs, Level 2 Programme and the Level 3 BTEC Extended Diploma. 
A-Level courses include; Art, Biology, Business, Chemistry, Drama and Theatre Studies, English Language, English Literature, Environmental Science, Film Studies, French, Further Mathematics, Geography, Graphic Communication, History, Law, Maths, Media Studies, Philosophy and Religion, Photography, Physics, Politics, Psychology, Sociology and Textiles.

Exam results
In 2017, Paston College's A Level results were 53% A*-B, 80% A*-C, 99% A*-E. At BTEC, students achieved 100% pass rates, with 63% achieving top grades. The majority of students go on to university, including Oxford, Cambridge and other Russel Groups.

Headmasters
1604-25:   Michael Tylles, MA(Cantab)[Corpus]
1625-40:   Thomas Acres, MA(Cantab)[Trinity]
1640-48:   Edward Warnes, MA(Cantab)[Corpus]
1648-66:   Henry Luce, MA(Cantab)[Queens']
1667-76:   Joseph Eldred, BA(Cantab)[Trinity]
1676-01:   Robert Harvey, MA(Cantab)[Emmanuel]
1701-03:   Nicholas Girling, BA(Cantab)[Christ's]
1703-21:   John Montford, MA(Cantab)[Trinity Hall]
1721-47:   John Gallant, BA(Cantab)[Corpus]
1747-64:   Alexander Campbell, MA(Aberdeen)
[1764-67: school closed for rebuilding]
1767-78:   John Price Jones, MA(Oxon)[Jesus]
1778-95:   Joseph Hepworth, MA(Cantab)[Queens’]
1796-07:   Henry Hunter, BA(Cantab)[Queen's] 
1807-25:   William Tylney Spurdens, BA(Oxon)[St Edmund Hall]
1825-35:   William Rees, BA(Oxon)[Jesus]
1835-43:   Samuel Rees, MA(Cantab)[St John's]
1843:      George Harrison Wharton Thompson, MA(Oxon)[Magdalen Hall]
1844-73:   Thomas Dry, MA(Oxon) [Merton Hall]
1874-78:   Frederick Richard Pentreath, MA, DD(Oxon)[Worcester]
1878-04:   Henry Whytehead Wimble, MA(Oxon)[Queen's]
1904-22:   George Hare [no degree; first non-ordained Master]
1922-46:   Major Percival Pickford, MA(Oxon)[Lincoln]
1946-75:   Lt Colonel Kenneth Newton Marshall, MA(Cantab)[Magdalene]
1975-81:   Kenneth Michael Harre, MA(Oxon)[Exeter](Rev)
1981-90:   Peter Brice
1990-96:   Molly Whitworth
1996-2012:   Peter Mayne, MA(Oxon)[St Edmund Hall], MA(Leic)
2012-17:   Kevin Grieve
2017–present:   Corrienne Peasgood OBE [no degree]

Coat of Arms
Since 1606, the college's coat of arms has been that of the Paston Family, containing a griffin and six fleur-de-lys. The college's motto De mieux en mieux en pour tout ("From good to better everywhere") features on the coat of arms.

Old Pastonians
 Sam Kelly, Britain's Got Talent contestant and musician
 Colonel James Woodham MC, Royal Anglian Regiment, awarded the Military Cross in peacetime in 2006 for gallantry
 Charlie Hall, QPM, Chief Constable, Hertfordshire Constabulary

Paston School
 Dr. James H. Keeler, Head of the Yusuf Hamied Department of Chemistry, University of Cambridge, 2018-
 Clive Baker, former professional goalkeeper
 Prof David Chiddick CBE, Vice Chancellor from 2000 to 2009 of the University of Lincoln
 Tony Colman, Labour MP from 1997 to 2005 for Putney
 Prof Henry Forder, mathematician, known for the Forder Lectureship
 Stephen Fry, British actor
 Edwin Le Grice, priest, Dean of Ripon from 1968 to 1984
 Prof Rod Morgan
 Craig Murray, Ambassador to Uzbekistan from 2002 to 2004
 Robin Nash, Head of Variety and later Head of Comedy at the BBC
 Horatio Nelson, 1st Viscount Nelson  
 William Nelson, 1st Earl Nelson
 Flight Sergeant Charles Roberts (January 19, 1921 - 17 May 1943, from Northrepps), who flew on the Dambusters Raid as a navigator in Lancaster AJ-A with pilot Squadron Leader Dinghy Young DFC in the second section of the first wave; his aircraft was the fourth to bomb the Möhne Dam, but was hit by flak at 02.58 when returning, near the Dutch coast at Castricum aan Zee; he is buried at Bergen General Cemetery
 Allan Smethurst, The Singing Postman
 Rev Norman Snaith
 Thomas Tenison, Archbishop of Canterbury
 Andrew Ian Cooper, British Chemist

North Walsham High School for Girls
 Gillian Shephard, Baroness Shepherd of Northwold, Conservative MP from 1987 to 2005 for South West Norfolk
 Carole Walker, BBC political correspondent

References

External links

Paston College Website

Educational institutions established in the 1600s
Sixth form colleges in Norfolk
1606 establishments in England
North Walsham